Robert Hodge was a Scottish professional footballer who played in the Scottish League for Clyde as an outside left.

Personal life 
Hodge's brother William also became a footballer.

Career statistics

References 

Year of death missing
Scottish footballers
Scottish Football League players
Association football outside forwards
Year of birth missing
Place of birth missing
Clyde F.C. players
Kirkintilloch Rob Roy F.C. players